Cha'an is a town of Shou County in central Anhui province, China. It has 1 residential community and 7 villages under its administration.

References 

Towns in Anhui
Shou County